The VTB United League Supercup Most Valuable Player award is an annual award that is given to the most valuable player for Supercup of the Northeast European regional of the VTB United League, which is the 1st-tier professional basketball league of Russia. The award has been given since the 2021–22 VTB United League season.

Winners

Awards won by nationality

Awards won by club

References

External links
 VTB United League Official Website 
 VTB United League Official Website 

VTB United League awards
Basketball most valuable player awards